Vlastimil Jansa (born November 27, 1942) is a Czech chess player. He was awarded the titles of International Master, in 1965, and Grandmaster, in 1974, by FIDE.

He learned chess while in hospital at the age of eight and at fourteen, became the youth champion of Prague, his native city. In 1959, he finished second in the Czechoslovak national junior championship. Academically, he qualified in sports sciences from the Charles University in Prague, before becoming a professional soldier and reaching the rank of captain. As part of his chess education, he studied under the tutelage of International Masters Emil Richter (1894–1971).

Jansa has been one of the Czech Republic's leading players for many years, collecting experience across a range of chess activities. Representing his country at the Chess Olympiad on a number of occasions, he won a team silver medal in 1982. He has also been a coach and a writer of books and theoretical articles. 

Also as a trainer, he developed a test in the 1970s from which the talent of young players could be measured. The strongest player of the Czech Republic David Navara is among his students. Jansa has also been the national coach of Luxembourg.

Along with International Master Josef Pribyl, he is known as one of the creators of an opening system known as the 'Czech Pirc'. The opening, distinguished by an early c6, offers the player of the black pieces the opportunity for greater flexibility, in order that an appropriate plan can be formulated, once white's strategy is revealed.

In international tournaments, he has been many times a winner, taking outright or shared first prize at Cerveny Kostelec 1959, Prague 1968, Madonna di Campiglio 1973, Amsterdam 1974, Vrnjacka Banja 1981, Trnava 1982, Borgarnes 1985, Gausdal 1987 (and third in 1988), Badenweiler 1990, Munster 1992 and Lazne Bohdanec 1997. He was a runner-up at Zinnowitz in 1964.

Jansa won the Czechoslovak Chess Championship in 1964, 1974 and 1984. Prior to the splitting into Czech Republic and Slovakia in 1993, he finished in the top three on no fewer than fourteen occasions. Post-millennium, he remains actively engaged in playing chess and finished second, taking the silver medal at the 2006 World Senior Chess Championship in Arvier, behind Viktor Korchnoi. Jansa won the 2018 World Senior Championship in the 65+ category, edging out Yuri Balashov on tiebreak score.

Partial bibliography

Dynamics of Chess Strategy - Jansa (Batsford, 2003)
How To Play The Pirc; A New System For Black - Jansa & Pribyl (Münster International, 1988)
The Best Move - Hort & Jansa (Pitman, 1980)

References

External links 

1942 births
Living people
Czech chess players
Czechoslovak chess players
Chess grandmasters
Chess writers
Chess coaches
National team coaches
Charles University alumni
Sportspeople from Prague